Houston J. Antwine (April 11, 1939 – December 26, 2011) was an American professional football player who was a defensive tackle in the American Football League (AFL) and National Football League (NFL). He played college football for the Southern Illinois.  He was selected by the AFL's Houston Oilers, then traded to the Boston Patriots in 1961.  He is in the Southern Illinois University Athletic Hall of Fame and the Patriots Hall of Fame.  A former NAIA wrestling champion, as a defensive tackle, the stocky "Twine" was nearly impossible to move out of the middle.

Antwine was cited by Pro Football Hall of Famer Billy Shaw as one of the American Football League's best pass rushers, athletic and very quick on his feet.  He usually drew double-team blocking.  He was an American Football League All-Star six straight years, from 1963 through 1968, was named to the All-Time All-AFL Team, and to the Patriots All-1960s (AFL) Team. He led the Patriots in sacks 3 times in his career.

Houston recorded 39 sacks, recovered four fumbles and had one interception in 142 regular season games for the Patriots.  He returned an interception two yards in a 28–20 win over the Broncos on December 12, 1965.  Houston led the team in sacks in 1967, 1968 & 1969.

Houston was the AFL Defensive Player of the Week as he sacked Dan Darragh three times in the Patriots' 16–7 win over the Buffalo Bills at War Memorial Stadium on September 8, 1968.   He was awarded the game ball for his performance in the Patriots' 26–10 win over the New York Jets  at Boston College 's Alumni Stadium on September 27, 1964.   He posted a career high ten tackles in the Patriots' 33–14 win over the Cincinnati Bengals at Fenway Park on  December 1, 1968.

Houston had four games with at least two sacks and recorded sacks of George Blanda, Joe Namath, Len Dawson, Bob Griese, Fran Tarkenton, and Johnny Unitas.  He recovered fumbles by Paul Lowe, Darrell Lester, Bert Coan & Dennis Shaw.

Houston was an AFL All-Star in 1963, 1964, 1965, 1966, 1967, and 1968.

See also
 List of American Football League players

References

External links
 New England Patriots bio

1939 births
2011 deaths
American football defensive linemen
Boston Patriots players
New England Patriots players
Philadelphia Eagles players
Southern Illinois Salukis football players
American Football League All-Star players
American Football League All-Time Team
People from Humphreys County, Mississippi
Players of American football from Mississippi
American Football League players